Ivanildo Rodrigues dos Santos (born December 12, 1988), commonly known simply as Ivan or Ivanildo, is a Brazilian born-Qatari football player who plays as a goalkeeper for Al-Rayyan.

Career
On October 2, 2011, Ivan made his professional debut as a starter for El Jaish in a league match against Lekhwiya.

In December 2012, while playing for El Jaish SC against Al Rayyan he sent a free-kick out for a corner from inside his own penalty area after completely slicing the ball when trying to find a team mate with the ball. The video of the incident went viral around the world on the internet.

References

External links
 El Jaish Profile
 
 إيفان حارس الجيش حصرياً لـ "الشرق":أحلم بلقب الحارس الأول في قطر; Al-Sharq, Retrieved January 13, 2012.

1988 births
Brazilian footballers
Qatari footballers
Living people
Al-Shamal SC players
El Jaish SC players
Lekhwiya SC players
Al-Gharafa SC players
Al-Markhiya SC players
Al Ahli SC (Doha) players
Al Sadd SC players
Al-Rayyan SC players
Qatar Stars League players
Association football goalkeepers
Qatari Second Division players
Expatriate footballers in Qatar
Brazilian expatriate sportspeople in Qatar
Qatari people of Brazilian descent
Naturalised citizens of Qatar